Michael James Davidson (born 20 July 1963 in Whangarei) is a former freestyle swimmer from New Zealand, who won the bronze medal in the men's 400 metres freestyle at the 1986 Commonwealth Games. He represented his native country at 1984 Summer Olympics. He served as head coach of High Tide Aquatics for five years and was announced as an assistant coach at the University of Alabama in June 2012.

A distance ace and team captain for the University of Alabama during the late 1980s, Davidson earned All-American honors in the mile and helped lead Alabama to the 1987 Southeastern Conference team title under the direction of legendary UA coach Don Gambril.
 
Before joining the Tide, he swam for New Zealand at the 1984 Olympics in Los Angeles where he posted top-16 finishes in the 400 and 1500-meter freestyles. He also earned a bronze medal at the 1986 Commonwealth Games. He was inducted into New Zealand's Northland Sports Legends Hall of Fame in 2011.

See also
 List of Commonwealth Games medallists in swimming (men)

References
 New Zealand Olympic Committee
 The University of Alabama Official Site - RollTide.com

1963 births
Living people
Alabama Crimson Tide men's swimmers
Olympic swimmers of New Zealand
New Zealand male freestyle swimmers
Swimmers at the 1984 Summer Olympics
Swimmers at the 1986 Commonwealth Games
Sportspeople from Whangārei
Commonwealth Games bronze medallists for New Zealand
Commonwealth Games medallists in swimming
Alabama Crimson Tide swimming coaches
Swimmers at the 1982 Commonwealth Games
20th-century New Zealand people
21st-century New Zealand people
Medallists at the 1986 Commonwealth Games